Direct Rail Services (DRS) is a rail freight company in Great Britain. As of 2022, it is one of seven publicly owned railway companies in the United Kingdom, the others being NI Railways (the passenger rail operator in Northern Ireland), LNER, Northern Trains, Southeastern, Transport for Wales Rail and ScotRail.

DRS was created as a wholly-owned subsidiary of British Nuclear Fuels Ltd (BNFL) during late 1994 with the primary purpose of taking over the rail-based handling of nuclear material from British Rail. As early as 1997, the company begun diversified into other operations, initially bidding for contracts to haul freight traffic for other companies such as Tesco and Eddie Stobart Group. Furthermore, DRS has branched into passenger services, these have included charters, such as the Northern Belle, and contracts with operators such as National Express East Anglia, Chiltern Railways, and Arriva Rail North. Additional rolling stock, such as the Class 57 and Class 88 locomotives, have been acquired by DRS during the 2010s.

In 2005, DRS was transferred from BNFL to the newly-created Nuclear Decommissioning Authority (NDA). During early 2021, further restructuring led to DRS, along with sibling subsidiaries Pacific Nuclear Transport Limited (PNTL) and International Nuclear Services (INS), falling under a new NDA division, Nuclear Transport Solutions (NTS).

History

Early operations
The origins of Direct Rail Services (DRS) can be traced back to the privatisation of British Rail during the 1990s; British Nuclear Fuels Ltd (BNFL) had a long-standing arrangement with British Rail for the latter to undertake the haulage of nuclear flask traffic, but the pending dissolution of British Rail led to BNFL considering other options. In October 1994, it was announced that BNFL had decided to perform rail transport and other railway-related services internally. For this purpose, DRS was set up as a wholly-owned rail freight subsidiary of BNFL, initially using a small fleet of five Class 20/3 locomotives.

Prior to 1998, DRS's nuclear haulage activities were exclusively related to the transporting of nuclear fuel rods from overseas to Sellafield for processing. During 1998, DRS took over the movement of fuel rods from various nuclear power stations across Britain, such as Heysham, Valley (for Wylfa), Bridgwater (for Hinkley Point), Berkeley (for Oldbury), Hunterston, Torness, Seaton Carew, Dungeness and Sizewell.

During 1997, DRS begun to diversify into the haulage of other traffic, having secured a contract to operate milk traffic from Penrith to Cricklewood. In 2002, it commenced running intermodal freight trains from Grangemouth to the Daventry International Rail Freight Terminal using Class 66/4 locomotives; it carries containers for both the Malcolm Group and Asda. In May 2020, DRS announced it had launched a new electrified freight route between the Daventry Freight Terminal and Mossend Yard, outside Glasgow.

The ownership of DRS was transferred from BNFL to the Nuclear Decommissioning Authority (NDA), following the creation of the NDA on 1 April 2005 under the terms of the Energy Act 2004. Since April 2021, DRS, as well as its sibling NDA subsidiaries Pacific Nuclear Transport Limited (PNTL) and International Nuclear Services (INS), have been operated by a newly-created NDA division, Nuclear Transport Solutions (NTS).

During 2006, DRS started a new service, the Tesco Express, on behalf of the Eddie Stobart Group in partnership with Tesco, the UK's largest food retailer, to move containers from Daventry north to Mossend and Inverness using a new dedicated low-emission Class 66 locomotive in Eddie Stobart livery, 66411 Eddie the Engine. A daily service from Grangemouth to Inverness followed in 2009, with another Class 66 in a promotional livery, this time 66414 James the Engine. The Daventry  Scotland Stobart contract transferred to DB Schenker in January 2010, along with the onward daily service to Inverness, though this reverted to DRS operation in summer 2011. In January 2022, DRS and Tesco signed a three-year extension deal; by this point, the company was transporting roughly 12,000 containers for Tesco per month.

As of 2021, DRS has stated its intention to grow its presence in the rail freight sector, particular in Scotland.

Passenger services

In 2007, seven Mark 3 carriages from Virgin Trains were refurbished at the Oxley depot. The following year saw the coaches used to operate charter services under the Stobart Rail banner, however, the Stobart Rail operation ceased in July 2008.

This included Summer Saturday Wherry Lines services. DRS have periodically operated services on the Wherry Lines during periods of diesel multiple unit shortage. During October 2014, it commenced operating a two-year contract to operate services on the Wherry Lines under contract to Abellio Greater Anglia. It was operated by top and tailed Class 47s hauling Mark 2s, top and tail Class 37s were introduced in mid-2015.

The trains were made up of Class 37s, Class 47s and Class 57s top and tailing DRS' Mark 3 carriages.

During April 2011, DRS commenced a five-year contract under which it provided Class 47 locomotives to haul the Northern Belle, a luxury passenger train. By 2013, the company was operating 140 passenger charters annually, roughly 100 of which were for the Northern Belle. By April 2018, the train was being hauled by Class 57s operated by West Coast Railways, the owner of the Norther Belle, instead.

Although the trial was reported to have been a success, plans to introduce regular services from December 2012 did not materialise until May 2015. To operate these services, DRS purchased a fleet of Mark 2 carriages and had these overhauled at Eastleigh Works. In May 2015, the company started to operate some services on the Cumbrian Coast Line under contract to Northern Rail (later Arriva Rail North) using top and tail Class 37s which hauled Mark 2 coaches. On 27 July 2015, one of the Class 37s was replaced by a DBSO, with the other replaced at a later date. On 29 January 2018, one set was made to be Top and Tail Class 68s, while the other stayed a Class 37 and DBSO. On 21 May 2018, there was only one set out, which was the Top and Tail Class 68s only running between Carlisle and Barrow-in-Furness. This service was ultimately replaced by Class 156 Diesel Multiple Units (transferred from ScotRail) on 28 December 2018, with special commemorative 'farewell' service being run for charity on 11 January 2019.

In June 2014, it was announced that Chiltern Railways had signed a contract with DRS for the latter to provide six of its Class 68 locomotives to haul express passenger services, replacing Class 67s hired from DBS. On 15 December 2014, the first of DRS-hauled Chiltern service departed Marylebone station; Chiltern noted that the Class 68s will be capable of hauling extended trains in the future. In addition to the locomotives themselves, DRS provided commissioning and maintenance services.

Depots

Direct Rail Services initially operated from a base at the nuclear reprocessing plant in Sellafield, but in 1998 moved into Carlisle Kingmoor depot which had been disused since 1987.
A second depot was opened at Crewe Gresty Bridge in March 2007. This is on the site of a former wagon works. 
It also operates the Motherwell depot, where it carries out inspection work and re-fuelling.

Fleet
The initial fleet of locomotives were five Class 20/3s which were overhauled at Brush Traction, Loughborough for their new duties.

In 1997, six Class 37/6s were purchased from international high speed passenger operator Eurostar. DRS would later build up an extensive fleet of Class 37 and 47 locomotives from various sources. In 2001, a number of Class 33s were purchased. During 2004, three Class 87s were trialed, but returned to their leasing company after six months. During 2008, DRS initiated efforts to acquire Class 57 locomotives; by 2013, it operated nine former Freightliner 57/0s as well as 12 former Virgin Trains 57/3s.

On 12 September 2013, it was announced that DRS would be the launch customer for the new Vossloh Euro Dual dual-mode freight locomotive by Vossloh España. These would become . DRS took delivery of the first of 15 new s in February 2014; these are diesel-only versions of the Class 88s which would arrive later. During October 2014, a further ten were ordered followed by another seven in July 2015. In April 2015, two Class 68s commenced operating Fife Circle Line services for Abellio ScotRail. A further batch of six Class 68s (6802068025) were delivered by on 5 April 2016.

On 8 January 2016, DRS announced it would sell 12 of its older locomotives, including one  locomotive (20312), six Class 37 locomotives (37503/510/521/608/611/670) and five Class 47 locomotives (47810/13/18/28/53) along with two of its Mark 2 coaches. By January 2022, the company was in the process of disposing of older rolling stock, such as Class 20s, Class 37s, Class 57s, and Mark 2 coaches, along with associated spare parts and other elements; this was reportedly one part of a wider fleet modernisation effort.

66301-66305 left DRS for GBRF at the end of 2022, as DRS restructured it's fleet.

Current fleet

Future fleet
In September 2017, Direct Rail Services issued a tender for ten brand new diesel-electric locomotives for mixed-traffic operations.

References

External links
 
 

Government-owned companies of the United Kingdom
Nuclear technology in the United Kingdom
Railway companies established in 1995
Rail transport in Cumbria
Rail freight companies in the United Kingdom
1995 establishments in England